Vălenii de Munte is a town in Prahova County, southern Romania (the historical region of Muntenia), with a population of 11,707 as of 2011.

The town's sister cities are Eaubonne, Cimișlia, and Sarandë.

History

The first recorded reference about the settlement dates back to 1431. In 1645 Vălenii de Munte (or Văleni for short) became the official residence of the then Săcueni County. Documents from 1832 note Valeni as having 518 households and 2,590 citizens. At the end of the 19th century, Vălenii de Munte was an urban commune, formed from the Văleni (Târgul-Văleni), Turburea, and Valea Gardului villages, having a total of 3,000 residents, who benefited from having a local hospital, pharmacy, post office, and telegraph station. In 1907 the historian Nicolae Iorga settled in Văleni, opening in January 1908 the People's Summer University. In 
The status was lost in the 1968 Administrative Reform, when Văleni became one of the towns of the newly established Prahova County.

People

Natives
 Roberto Alecsandru (born 1996), footballer
 Sergiu Arnăutu (born 1990), footballer
 Mădălina Manole (1967–2010), singer, actress
 Gheorghe Pănculescu (1844–1924), engineer
 Laurențiu Rebega (born 1976), politician
 Horia Stamatu (1912–1989), poet and essayist

Notable residents
 Nicolae Iorga (1871–1940), historian, politician, writer
 Nicolae Tonitza (1886–1940), painter

Museums
 Nicolae Iorga memorial house
 Teleajen Valley ethnographic museum
 Plum tree growing natural science museum
 Queen Mary religious arts museum and national missionary school

Climate
Vălenii de Munte has a humid continental climate (Cfb in the Köppen climate classification).

References

Towns in Romania
Populated places in Prahova County
Localities in Muntenia